The Lisbon Story is a 1943 British musical composed by Harry Parr-Davies with a Book by Harold Purcell. It was produced by Edward Black. The plot is a wartime spy thriller set in Lisbon and Paris during the summer of 1942.

It premiered at the Imperial Theatre, Brighton before transferring to the West End where it ran for 493 performances at the London Hippodrome from 17 June 1943 to 8 July 1944. The original cast included Patricia Burke, Albert Lieven, Jack Livesey, Noele Gordon, Reginald Long and George Hayes. The song "Pedro the Fisherman" became a particular hit and was subsequently recorded by various artists including Richard Tauber, Gracie Fields, and Julie Andrews.

Film Adaptation
In 1946 it was adapted into a film Lisbon Story produced by British National Films. Directed by Paul L. Stein it starred Burke, David Farrar and Walter Rilla with several other actors reprising their roles from the original stage work.

References

Bibliography
 Goble, Alan. The Complete Index to Literary Sources in Film. Walter de Gruyter, 1999.
 Wearing, J.P. The London Stage 1940-1949: A Calendar of Productions, Performers, and Personnel.  Rowman & Littlefield, 2014.

1943 musicals
British musicals
West End musicals
British plays adapted into films
Plays set in France
Plays set in Portugal